Nanyang Sin-Chew Lianhe Zaobao (literally "Nanyang Sin-Chew Joint Morning Paper"), commonly abbreviated as Lianhe Zaobao (literally "Joint Morning Paper"), is the largest Singaporean Chinese-language newspaper with a daily circulation of about 136,900 (print and digital) as of 2021. Published by SPH Media Trust (formerly Singapore Press Holdings), it was formed on 16 March 1983 as a result of a merger between Nanyang Siang Pau and Sin Chew Jit Poh, two of Singapore's oldest Chinese newspapers.

The paper establishes itself as a broadsheet with local news coverage, while international news tend to be largely centred on the East Asia region, with a section dedicated to China. Zaobao has an East Asian correspondent network spanning Beijing, Chongqing, Shanghai, Guangzhou, Hong Kong, Taipei, Seoul and Tokyo.  It is SPH's flagship Chinese daily and the only Chinese-language morning daily in Singapore. Lianhe Zaobao is the only Chinese-language overseas newspaper which can be purchased in major cities of mainland China. As with all Chinese-language publications currently based in Singapore, the paper is printed in Simplified Chinese.

History 
In 1974, after the Newspaper and Printing Presses Act was passed in Singapore, the Singapore branch of Sin Chew Jit Poh was reorganised into a public entity under the name Sin Chew Jit Poh (Singapore), while the Singapore edition of Nanyang Siang Pau became owned by Nanyang Press Singapore. The two Chinese broadsheets in Singapore merged in March 1983 in anticipation of the impending falling readership, due to English being taught as first language in Singaporean schools. The merger led to the formation of Singapore News and Publications, which published the morning paper Lianhe Zaobao as well as the evening paper Lianhe Wanbao. Lianhe Zaobao was the most read newspaper in Singapore among all English and Chinese newspapers, according to a survey conducted by Survey Research Singapore in 1983, with a readership of 689,000 on weekdays and 743,000 on Sundays. On 4 August 1984, the company merged with The Straits Times Press Group and Times Publishing Berhad to form Singapore Press Holdings.

From 8 September 2016, the portal also presents news from two other Singapore Press Holdings Chinese-language newspapers, Lianhe Wanbao and Shin Min Daily News. 

According to a 2021 study from the Reuters Institute for the Study of Journalism, the paper has a weekly offline reach of 8% and online reach of 7% in Singapore.

Editorial stance 
Lianhe Zaobao, as with all SPH media, is regarded as pro-government, or pro-PAP, which is the incumbent political party of the nation state since independence.

The newspaper is also regarded as pro-Beijing,⁣ and often includes foreign opinion editorials from pro-Chinese Communist Party sources such as People's Daily, HK01, Ming Pao, Global Times, China Times, Beijing Youth Daily. It is one of the few foreign newspapers allowed in China, where foreign media is tightly controlled.

Format
Broadsheet

The paper is published daily by SPH and usually hits newsstands and homes by 5 am local time.  Zaobao is currently published in four segments.  The first comprises breaking news (焦点新闻) and local news under ZaobaoSINGAPORE (早报新加坡), followed by a sports section (早报体育).  The second comprises ZaobaoChina (早报中国), the daily editorial, commentaries, letters to the press, other international news from the ASEAN, followed by a finance section ZaobaoBUSINESS (早报财经). A supplementary lifestyle, arts and entertainment segment is named zbNOW (早报现在).  A minor segment comprises obituaries and classified advertising.

The Sunday edition is titled zbSunday (早报星期天), with a tabloid-format lifestyle supplement pull-out zbWeekly (早报周刊).

Zaobao Digital

The newspaper is available in Southeast Asia, China, Hong Kong as well as organisations such as the United Nations. The online version of the paper Zaobao.com was launched in August 1995 under the name of "Lianhe Zaobao Online". It serves as a news portal drawing news not just from the Lianhe Zaobao, but also from other Chinese newspapers in the region, numbering as much as 100 sources in total. A large proportion of Lianhe Zaobao's daily readership is derived from China, with the official website cites a monthly online readership of 4 million originating from China.

Zaobao.com is targeted at audiences in Greater China, while Zaobao.sg (re-launched in September 2016) targets local and non-China readers.

ZBSchools.sg 
ZBSchools.sg is an online portal hosting several publications targeted at students such as zbCOMMA (早报逗号), Thumbs Up (大拇指), Thumbs Up Junior (小拇指) and Thumbs Up Little Junior (小小拇指). zbCOMMA is targeted at secondary school students, Thumbs Up at upper primary students, Thumbs Up Junior at lower primary students and Thumbs Up Little Junior at kindergarten students.

zbCOMMA used to be known as Friday Weekly (星期5周报) before its revamp on 7 January 2009. It consists of follow-ups on news on Lianhe Zaobao, articles written by Zaobao reporters and blurbs for Zaobao news that serve to connect students with Zaobao.

Thumbs Up reports both international and local news. It has a section with mock examination questions to help students prepare for examinations. Thumbs Up promotes arts education by featuring art pieces selected by local artistic guides. It also has a section for fun and games, which features Chinese comics contributed by readers, as well as a weekly cartoon story on the mascot of the paper.

Blocking in mainland China 
The Zaobao online website is occasionally blocked in China, or has its posts removed on Sina Weibo. In 2009, the Zaobao website was temporarily blocked in China, analysts in China believed it was likely related to an article Lianhe Zaobao ran headlined "Cyber Crackdown in China Angers Netizens" which sparked the temporary ban, as discourse against the Chinese government is often censored in Mainland China. The paper was again reportedly blocked in 2017 with no official reasons cited.

See also
List of newspapers in Singapore
List of newspapers
Censorship in Singapore
SPH Media Trust

Print sources
 , Our 70 years: history of leading Chinese newspapers in Singapore (1993), Published by Singapore Press Holdings

References

External links
 Zaobao.com, official site of Lianhe Zaobao 
 ZBSchools.sg 
 
  

1983 establishments in Singapore
Newspapers published in Singapore
SPH Media Trust
Chinese-language newspapers (Simplified Chinese)
Publications established in 1983
Chinese-language mass media in Singapore